Parliamentary elections were held in Croatia on 3 January 2000 to elect members of the Chamber of Representative. They were the first elections to be held after the expiration of a full four-year term of the previous Chamber of Representatives.

The ruling Croatian Democratic Union entered the elections weakened by the Zagreb Crisis, street protests and the series of corruption scandals that came to light in the previous parliamentary term. However, the most important factor was the deteriorating health of the party leader and Croatian president Franjo Tuđman, which sparked a succession struggle between various factions within the party.

On the other side, two major Croatian opposition parties – the Social Democratic Party of Croatia and Croatian Social Liberal Party – had their coalition formally agreed in 1998 and spent more than a year preparing for the elections. At first, they were to run together with the Croatian Peasant Party, Croatian People's Party, Istrian Democratic Assembly and Liberal Party, but as Tuđman's condition worsened, leaders of the SDP and HSLS concluded that they could win elections even without the four other parties, which later formed a separate bloc.

Like before all previous elections since the breakup of Yugoslavia, the electoral laws were altered in an attempt to improve the chances for the ruling party; this included a new voting system and redistricting. The first-past-the-post constituencies introduced in the previous election were scrapped and proportional representation was implemented (with the exception of ethnic minority seats). The country was divided into ten electoral districts, all drawn in order to maximise the support for HDZ. Each district had to elect 14 members with an electoral threshold of 5%.

Due to Tuđman's illness and death in December 1999, the elections were repeatedly postponed for constitutional reasons. There was speculation about elections being held during the Christmas holidays in order to have as many Croatian expatriates (traditionally HDZ supporters) in the country, but the date of 3 January was chosen as the most suitable. As election day, the outcome became more certain. The campaign was brief and relatively uneventful with the HDZ being visibly weakened and demoralised by the death of its long-term leader. On election day, voter turnout – the highest since 1990 – indicated the desire to see a change of government.

Following the elections, Social Democratic Party leader Ivica Račan was appointed Prime Minister on 27 January 2000, by a decree of Acting President and Speaker of the outgoing assembly of Parliament, Vlatko Pavletić, with the appointment confirmed by a parliamentary vote on 2 February in which 122 of 151 MPs voted in favor and one against the cabinet, while one MP abstained. Račan led a coalition of SDP and HSLS, which together with a bloc of four other parties held a supermajority in parliament, allowing them to amend the Constitution and transform Croatia from a semi-presidential system into an incomplete parliamentary system in November 2000, and abolish the upper chamber, the Chamber of Counties, in March 2001. The constitutional changes of 2000 greatly limited the power of the president, but retained the direct election of the office.

Results

Minority seats
National minorities elected five representatives through a separate election system: Milan Đukić (47,7% of votes) for the Serb national minority, Tibor Santo (42,8%) for the Hungarian minority, Furio Radin (78,9%) for the Italian minority, Zdenka Čuhnil (40,6%) for the Czech and Slovak minorities and Borislav Graljuk (34,1%) for the Austrian, German, Jewish, Rusyn and Ukrainian minorities.

Composition

References

Croatia
Elections in Croatia
Croatia
Parliament